The 2020 Tajikistan Cup is the 29th edition of the Tajikistan Cup, the knockout football tournament of Tajikistan, with the winner of the cup qualifying for the 2021 AFC Cup.

Format
On 13 June the preliminary round draw was held, and the format for the competition confirmed. Due to the COVID-19 pandemic in Tajikistan each stage of the tournament would be a single legged tie instead of a two-legged ties to a single legged tie. On 4 July, the dates and kickoff times for the preliminary round matches where confirmed for the 7 and 8 July 2020.

The draw for the Last 16 took place on 15 July 2020, with the eight games to take place over the weekend of 1-3 August 2020.

On 3 August, following Istiklol's victory over Mohir in the last of the Last 16 matches, the Quarter-final draw took place.

Following the conclusion of Lokomotiv-Pamir defeat to Regar-TadAZ on 15 September in the Quarterfinals, the Semifinal draw took place.

After Khatlon's victory over Istaravshan on 23 September, to join Ravshan Kulob in the final of the Tajikistan Cup, it was announced that the game would take place on 10 October at the Pamir Stadium in Dushanbe.

Teams

Round and draw dates

Preliminary round

Last 16

Quarterfinals

Semifinals

Final

Scorers

See also
2020 Tajikistan Higher League
2020 Tajikistan First League

External links

Tajikistan Cup News

References

Tajikistan Cup
Tajikistan
Cup